The Team Trek Adecco was a Norwegian UCI Continental cycling team that existed, first as an Amateur team, from 2004 to 2007, and then as a UCI Continental team from 2008 to 2009. The team was discontinued after the 2009 season.

References

UCI Continental Teams (Europe)
Cycling teams established in 2004
Cycling teams disestablished in 2009
Cycling teams based in Norway
Defunct cycling teams based in Norway